William Carlton Lord (January 7, 1900 – August 15, 1947) was a third baseman in Major League Baseball. He played for the Philadelphia Phillies.

References

External links

1900 births
1947 deaths
Major League Baseball third basemen
Philadelphia Phillies players
Baseball players from Philadelphia